Johnny Messner (13 October 1909, in New York City – January 1986, in Ridgefield Park, New Jersey) was an American bandleader, composer, saxophonist, and vocalist during the big band/swing heyday.

Background 
Messner grew up in Ridgefield Park, New Jersey and graduated from Ridgefield Park High School in 1928. Messner received a scholarship to study at the Juilliard School of Music. During World War II he was drafted into the US Army, where he served as bandleader for ensembles at military training facilities across the United States. After the war ended, he joined Vincent Lopez's orchestra as an assistant bandleader and saxophonist.

Family 
Messner was the youngest of five male siblings.  An older brother, Dick Messner, was also a musician and bandleader.  All five brothers performed together in Johnny's orchestra: Dick (piano), Johnny (violin and clarinet), Charlie (né Charles Messner; 1905–2003) (woodwinds), Bill (né William Messner; 1904–1982) (drums), Fred (né Frederick Messner; born 1902) (violin).  The Five Brothers made their radio broadcast debut in 1923 on NBC, then known as WJZ.

References

External links 
Solid! mini-biography on Messner

American jazz bandleaders
American jazz composers
American male jazz composers
American jazz saxophonists
American male saxophonists
American jazz singers
People from Ridgefield Park, New Jersey
Ridgefield Park High School alumni
1909 births
1986 deaths
20th-century American singers
20th-century American composers
20th-century American saxophonists
20th-century American male musicians
20th-century jazz composers